Mandangad Fort (also called Chitradurga Fort)
is about 2 km from Mandangad town in Ratnagiri District, Maharashtra. This fort is said to be constructed by King Bhoj. After the Mughals lost the Battle of Umberkhind , This fort was captured by Shivaji in the battle with Adil Shah. A 400-year-old cannon is the major feature of the fort. The fort constitutes a Ganapati Temple and a tank called Thorla Talav. 

It consists of three separate fortifications - Mandangad proper to the south, Parkot in the middle while Jamba in the north. The Jamba water reservoir is now dry. Even though they are believed be much older, local legend attributes Mandangad to Shivaji, Parkot to Habshi of the Siddis and Jamba to Kanhoji Angre(also called Angria). All three forts were captured in 1818 by Col. Kennedy.

References 

Forts in Maharashtra
Tourist attractions in Ratnagiri district
Forts in Ratnagiri district
Ratnagiri district